Otto Scheffels (2 March 1897 – 4 November 1955) was a German painter. His work was part of the painting event in the art competition at the 1936 Summer Olympics.

References

1897 births
1955 deaths
20th-century German painters
20th-century German male artists
German male painters
Olympic competitors in art competitions
People from Venlo